The 2010 Japanese Formula 3 Championship was the 32nd edition of the Japanese Formula 3 Championship. It commenced on April 17 at Suzuka and ended on October 17 at Autopolis after 16 races held at eight race meetings.

All the Championship Class titles were secured at the Okayama meeting in September, with Yuji Kunimoto securing the drivers' title with five races to spare. The TOM'S driver had recorded a series record ten consecutive wins to start the season before finishing second to team-mate Rafael Suzuki in round 11 to secure the title. Despite not winning another race after clinching the title, Kunimoto still finished 58 points ahead of closest rival Yuhi Sekiguchi of ThreeBond Racing. Sekiguchi failed to win a race, but finished eleven races on the podium and overhauled Suzuki for the runner-up position. Suzuki had taken three wins in succession – two at Okayama and one at Sugo but failed to take part in either race at the final round at Autopolis in order to prioritise his commitments for the Macau Grand Prix the following month.

Koki Saga finished fourth, taking his first two victories in Formula Three at the final meeting at Autopolis, while Alexandre Imperatori finished fifth. The only other race-winner was Hideki Yamauchi, who took six podium finishes – including a win at Sugo – in his eight starts. Suzuki's first win at Okayama also gave TOM'S the teams title and the engine tuners championship, having amassed a maximum score up to round 14. ThreeBond Racing finished runners-up in the teams' championship, while Hanashima Racing's Toyota engines finished second in the tuners' championship.

In the National Class, the championship battle revolved around two drivers, HFDP Racing's Takashi Kobayashi and TOM'S Spirit driver Naoya Gamou, with the championship race going down to the final meeting at Autopolis. Kobayashi's sixth win of the season in the first race of the weekend, coupled with a Gamou retirement allowed Kobayashi to clinch the title with a race to spare. Gamou took eight wins on the season – including seven in succession at Fuji along with doubles at Motegi, Okayama and Sugo – but finished three points in arrears of Kobayashi. Third place went to Team Le Beausset's Katsumasa Chiyo, who won at the first Motegi meeting and fourth went to the other race-winner, Team Nova's Kimiya Sato, who won at the second Fuji meeting. As well as Kobayashi's drivers' championship, HFDP Racing clinched the teams' championship by five points ahead of TOM'S Spirit.

Teams and drivers
 The provisional entry list for the series was released on March 10, 2010. All teams were Japanese-registered.

Notes

Race calendar and results
 All races were held in Japan, and were in support of Formula Nippon at all rounds except the first Fuji round and Okayama.

Championship standings

Drivers' Championships
Points were awarded as follows:

Teams' Championships
Points were awarded for both races as follows:

Engine Tuners' Championship
Points were awarded for both races as follows:

References

External links

 Official Site 

Formula Three
Japanese Formula 3 Championship seasons
Japan
Japanese Formula 3